Dexter "The Blade" Jackson (born November 25, 1969) is an American retired IFBB professional bodybuilder and the 2008 Mr. Olympia bodybuilding champion and 2012 Masters Mr. Olympia. With 29 wins, Jackson has the most professional men's bodybuilding titles. He has the distinction of winning the Arnold Classic a record five times (2005, 2006, 2008, 2013, 2015). After winning the Arnold Classic in 2015, he proceeded to place second in the 2015 Mr. Olympia. He is from Jacksonville, Florida. He retired from professional bodybuilding following the 2020 Mr. Olympia.

Biography
Dexter's first NPC (National Physique Committee) competition was the NPC Southern States Championship of 1992, where he took 3rd. He first competed professionally in the 1999 Arnold Classic, Night of Champions, and Mr. Olympia contests, placing 7th, 3rd, and 9th, respectively.

At the 2007 Mr. Olympia, Jackson placed 3rd and many critics said he would not likely place any higher. On September 27, 2008, he defeated the reigning champion Jay Cutler to become the 12th man to win the title, and only the second man since Ronnie Coleman to win both Mr. Olympia and Arnold Classic title in the same calendar year. Jackson has won the Mr. Olympia title once, sharing this distinction with Chris Dickerson (1982), Samir Bannout (1983), Shawn Rhoden (2018) and Brandon Curry (2019).

2008 was a great year for Jackson, as he won the Arnold Classic, Australian Pro Grand Prix VIII, New Zealand Grand Prix, Russian Grand Prix and the Mr. Olympia. Jackson placed 3rd in the 2009 Mr. Olympia contest.

In 2012, Jackson placed 4th in the Mr. Olympia, then surprised everyone by winning that year's Masters Olympia at the age of 43 and then won his fourth Arnold Classic title in 2013.

In 2015, Jackson showed he was still a force to be reckoned with at the age of 45 when he placed 2nd at the Mr. Olympia; his highest placing since winning the Mr. Olympia in 2008.

In 2020, Jackson announced that he will compete at the Mr.Olympia and this will be his final show after competing professionally since 1999. He placed 9th at that show, the same placing as his Olympia debut in 1999.

Jackson has been featured in many fitness and bodybuilding articles, including being pictured on the cover of Muscular Development and Flex magazine. He shot his new documentary DVD titled Dexter Jackson: Unbreakable with filmmaker Alex Ardenti of Ardenti Films in Florida and California which was released in 2009.

Distinctions

, Jackson has made a record-setting 20 Mr. Olympia appearances.
Jackson is the only bodybuilder to win the overall title in both the Mr. Olympia and Masters Olympia bodybuilding competitions.
Jackson has won the original Arnold Classic five times (2005, 2006, 2008, 2013, 2015), more than any other bodybuilder.
Jackson is one of only four bodybuilders to have won both the Mr. Olympia and Arnold Classic titles. The other 3 are Ronnie Coleman, Jay Cutler & Brandon Curry.
Jackson is the fifth oldest bodybuilder (second oldest male bodybuilder) ever to win an open IFBB pro show at the age of 49 years 8 months and 9 days after Yaxeni Oriquen-Garcia at the age of 49 years 10 months and 13 days, Lisa Aukland at the age of 49 years and 364 days, and 50 years and 361 days, Betty Pariso at the age of 53, and Albert Beckles at the age of between 52 and 61.

Business ventures

In 2009, following his win at the 2008 Mr. Olympia, Dexter Jackson created his own bodybuilding competition - The Dexter Classic.

In early 2021, just following his retirement Jackson announced he would be launching his own supplements line of products in April 2021.  This will contain a full line of 27 SKU’s of Dexter Jackson Signature Series supplements. Jackson stated he had been planning this venture since his departure from Ultimate Nutrition in 2015.

Physical stats 
Height:  
Contest Weight: 
Off Season Weight: 
Chest: 52" (132 cm)
Arms: 20" (50 cm)

Contest history

1992 NPC Southern States, Lightweight, 3rd
1995 NPC USA Championships, Light-Heavyweight, 1st
1996 NPC Nationals, Light-Heavyweight, 6th
1998 North American Championships, Light-HeavyWeight, 1st and Overall
1999 Arnold Classic, 7th
1999 Grand Prix England, 4th
1999 Night of Champions, 3rd
1999 Mr. Olympia, 9th
1999 World Pro Championships, 4th
2000 Arnold Classic, 5th
2000 Grand Prix Hungary, 2nd
2000 Ironman Pro Invitational, 3rd
2000 Night of Champions, 8th
2000 Mr. Olympia, 9th
2000 Toronto Pro Invitational, 2nd
2001 Arnold Classic, 5th
2001 Grand Prix Australia, 3rd
2001 Grand Prix England, 4th
2001 Grand Prix Hungary, 3rd
2001 Night of Champions, 2nd
2001 Mr. Olympia, 8th
2001 Toronto Pro Invitational, 2nd
2002 Arnold Classic, 3rd
2002 Grand Prix Australia, 2nd
2002 Grand Prix Austria, 2nd
2002 Grand Prix England, 1st
2002 Grand Prix Holland, 3rd
2002 Mr. Olympia, 4th
2002 San Francisco Pro Invitational, 3rd
2002 Show of Strength Pro Championship, 6th
2003 Arnold Classic, 4th
2003 Maximum Pro Invitational, 3rd
2003 Mr. Olympia, 3rd
2003 San Francisco Pro Invitational, 3rd
2003 Show of Strength Pro Championship, 1st
2004 Arnold Classic, 3rd
2004 Grand Prix Australia, 1st
2004 Ironman Pro Invitational, 1st
2004 Mr. Olympia, 4th
2004 San Francisco Pro Invitational, 1st
2005 Arnold Classic, 1st
2005 San Francisco Pro Invitational, 2nd
2006 Arnold Classic, 1st
2006 Mr. Olympia, 4th
2007 Arnold Classic, 2nd
2007 IFBB Australian Pro Grand Prix, 1st
2007 Mr. Olympia, 3rd
2008 Arnold Classic, 1st
2008 IFBB Australian Pro Grand Prix VIII, 1st
2008 IFBB New Zealand Grand Prix, 1st
2008 IFBB Russian Grand Prix, 1st
2008 Mr. Olympia, 1st
2009 Mr. Olympia, 3rd
2010 Arnold Classic, 4th
2010 IFBB Australian Pro Grand Prix, 2nd
2010 Mr. Olympia, 4th
2011 Flex Pro, 2nd
2011 Mr. Olympia, 6th
2011 FIBO Pro, 1st
2011 Pro Masters World Champion, 1st
2012 Arnold Classic, 5th
2012 Mr. Olympia, 4th
2012 IFBB Masters Olympia, 1st
2013 Arnold Classic, 1st
2013 IFBB Australian Pro Grand Prix, 1st
2013 Mr. Olympia, 5th
2013 EVLS Prague Pro, 2nd
2013 Tijuana Pro, 1st
2014 Mr. Olympia, 5th
2014 Arnold Classic Europe, 3rd
2014 Dubai Pro, 1st
2014 Prague Pro, 2nd
2015 Arnold Classic, 1st
2015 Arnold Classic Australia, 1st
2015 Arnold Classic Europe, 1st
2015 Mr. Olympia, 2nd
2015 Prague Pro, 1st
2016 New York Pro, 1st
2016 Arnold Classic South Africa, 1st
2016 Mr. Olympia, 3rd
2016 Arnold Classic Europe, 1st
2016 Prague Pro, 3rd
2016 Mr. Olympia Europe, 1st
2017 Mr. Olympia, 4th
2017 Prague Pro, 3rd
2018 Arnold Classic, 2nd
2018 IFBB Arnold Classic Australia, 3rd
2018 Mr. Olympia, 7th
2019 Tampa Pro, 1st
2019 Mr. Olympia, 4th
2020 Arnold Classic, 2nd
2020 Mr. Olympia, 9th

References

External links
 
Dexterjacksonshredded.com archived

1969 births
Living people
African-American bodybuilders
Professional bodybuilders
American bodybuilders
People from Jacksonville, Florida
21st-century African-American people
20th-century African-American sportspeople